Henry Case (November 19, 1823 – March 12, 1884) was a brigadier general in the American Civil War.

Case, son of Deacon Samuel and Sally (Bailey) Case, was born in Norwich, Conn., November 19, 1823.

Case was one of the 15 founders of Delta Kappa Epsilon before graduating from Yale College in 1846.  After graduating he studied law in Norwich, and began practice in Winchester, Illinois, thence removing to Middletown, Conn.  Subsequently he took a two-year course in the Yale Divinity School, and was ordained an evangelist at Norwich, July 31, 1855. He went immediately to Ohio, and was stated preacher, first at McConnellsville, and afterwards at Cuyahoga Falls. After some years he resumed the practice of the law.

In the late civil war, he was appointed (May 1863) Colonel of the 129th Illinois Volunteer Infantry Regiment, served as such for two years, and accompanied Gen. William Tecumseh Sherman on his march to the sea. He was breveted Brigadier General in March 1865.

On the return of peace, he reopened his law-office in Jacksonville.  His health failing, he finally returned to his father's house in Norwich, where he died, March 12, 1884, aged 60 years.  He was never married.

External links

1823 births
1884 deaths
Union Army generals
Military personnel from Norwich, Connecticut
Illinois lawyers
Yale Divinity School alumni
People from Winchester, Illinois
People from Middletown, Connecticut
Yale College alumni
19th-century American lawyers
Military personnel from Illinois